Dahal is a Nepali and Indian surname of Khas origin, and also prevalent in some regions of India mainly in West Bengal, Uttarakhand and Northeast, and few parts of Bhutan. The Dahals belong to the Indo-Aryan ethinic group, within the gentry class including Brahmin (high priest), Chhetri (ruling) or Rajput (i.e. Royal clan) castes in accordance to traditional Hindu classification system. 

The main deity of Dahal is Ishta deity Mahadev and clan deity Agnibetal (Mama) and nephew (Barmasto) (Black Masto) and (Burme) are also called. Dahal should offer incense to their clan deity on every full moon and if not on full moon then on fifth day. When lighting incense for the clan, incense should be lit in 2 places. Milk should not be consumed on the full moon day and should not be given to others. Many years ago, 2 of dahal girls (Vasanta Mala and Mohantamala) drowned in milk on the day of Gothdhup, so the holy milk of Yash day is considered impure, but the milk of Purnima day can be stored and used the next day. It was said that coal and corn cob should not be used for clan incense, but some Dahal brothers should use it, but this is wrong. When incense is applied to the whole body, it should be applied in 2 places. Nothing happens when family members, unmarried girls and nieces see the lamp of the clan lit, and nothing happens when nephews see it. And you should not show your relatives to anyone else. On the day of Chandi Purnima, the family's lamp kalash should be circumambulated in the house so that no external negative forces are affected. There are 2 hunters in dahal clan who protect the clan and the Bangas and that hunter's name is Raktabhogi Shikari and Panch Mukhi Shikari.

Notable people 
 Pushpa Kamal Dahal (born 1954), Nepali politician, current Prime minister of Nepal, chairman of the Nepal Communist Party
 Bhusan Dahal (born 1966), Nepali media tycoon
 Dayaram Dahal, Nepali film director
 Bhim Prasad Dahal (born 1954), Leader of Sikkim Democratic Front
 Renu Dahal - Nepalese politician, current mayor of Bharatpur Metropolitan City
 Shailendra Kumar Upadhyay Dahal, Former Minister, Nepali Ambassador and UN Representative
 Chandra Devi Dahal (born 1986), Nepali woman footballer
 Nara Bahadur Dahal (born 1960), Nepali long-distance runner
Prince Dahal (born 2004), badminton player from Nepal
Ramesh Dahal (born 1978), Nepali songwriter and lyricist
Mahesh Raj Dahal (born 1972), Ambassador of Nepal to Australia
 Biswonath Upadhyay Dahal, Former Chief Justice of Nepal
Bhuvan Kumar Dahal (born 1964), CEO Nepal Sanima Bank Ltd
Govinda Prasad Dahal born 1968, Province Forest Director, Karnali Province

Images

See also
 Khas people
 Khas Kingdom
 Rajput
 Boston Brahmins

References

Surnames of Nepalese origin
Khas surnames